Rear Admiral Nassar Ikram, HI(M), SI(M) was a two-star rank admiral in the Pakistan Navy, who is currently serving as Vice chancellor of University of Central Punjab.

Career

He joined Pakistan Navy in 1979 and was commissioned Weapon Engineering branch in December 1983 winning the coveted sword of Honor.  He graduated in Electrical Engineering from Pakistan Navy Engineering College with distinction in 1985, then affiliated with NED University, Karachi. Admiral did his Weapon Engineering Application Course from UK in 1989 with distinction.  He obtained Masters in Electronics Systems Engineering from Cranfield University, UK in 1995 winning the best student award.  He is a graduate of National Defence University, Islamabad in  National Security and War Studies. and holds Master's degree in National Security & War Studies from Quaid-e-Azam University, Islamabad and Doctorate Degree in Cryptography from Bradford University, UK in 1999 during which, his 2 papers won the best IEEE paper wards in US.

He served onboard PNS Tughril, PNS Dacca, PNS Shamsher and PNS Munsif as Weapon Engineering Officer / Deputy Weapon Engineering Officer.  He also served at PN Dockyard. He was an instructor at Electronic Warfare Training Centre, PNS Bahadur. 
His distinguished appointments include Deputy Director General Inter-Services Intelligence, Assistant Chief of the Naval Staff at Naval Headquarters (NHQ) and Commandant Pakistan Navy Engineering College. He served as Pro-Rector, Research Innovation and Commercialization at NUST and played a pivotal role in the establishment of Pakistan’s first Science and Technology Park the National Science and Technology Park (NSTP). He served as NSTP's founding Vice-President. He is currently serving as Vice-Chancellor at University of Central Punjab.

Awards and decorations

References

Pakistan Navy admirals
Living people
Recipients of Sitara-i-Imtiaz
Recipients of Hilal-i-Imtiaz
Year of birth missing (living people)
NED University of Engineering & Technology alumni
Alumni of Cranfield University
Alumni of the University of Bradford
Vice-Chancellors of universities in Pakistan